Santa Fe Trail is a historic 19th century transportation route.

Santa Fe Trail may also refer to:
 Santa Fe National Historic Trail, National Historic Trail through Missouri, Kansas, Oklahoma, Colorado, and New Mexico, USA
 Santa Fe Trail Scenic and Historic Byway, National Scenic Byway in Colorado, USA
 Santa Fe Trail Scenic Byway, National Scenic Byway in New Mexico, USA
 Santa Fe Trail (film), a 1940 American Western film
 Santa Fe Trail (short subjects) a 1943–1945 Warner Bros short subjects Western series with Robert Shayne
 Santa Fe Trails, the local transit authority in Santa Fe, New Mexico
 The Santa Fe Trail (1923 film), a 1923 Western film serial
 The Santa Fe Trail (1930 film), a 1930 American pre-Code western film
 New Santa Fe Trail, an auto trail
 Santa Fe Trail problem, genetic programming exercise